Georges Henry (25 October 1907 – 31 May 1981) was a French sprinter. He competed in the men's 400 metres at the 1936 Summer Olympics.

References

1907 births
1981 deaths
Athletes (track and field) at the 1936 Summer Olympics
French male sprinters
Olympic athletes of France
Place of birth missing